General Dick may refer to:

Charles W. F. Dick (1858–1945), Ohio National Guard major general
Franklin Archibald Dick (1823–1885), Missouri provost marshal general
Robert Henry Dick (1787–1846), British Army major general

See also
James Dick-Cunyngham (1877–1935), British Army major general